This is a list of members of the Australian House of Representatives of the 44th Parliament of Australia (2013–2016), as elected at the 2013 federal election.

Notes

References

Members of Australian parliaments by term
21st-century Australian politicians
2010s politics-related lists